The following is a list of explorers. Their common names, countries of origin (modern and former), centuries when they were active and main areas of exploration are listed below.

List

See also 

 Age of Discovery
 Astronaut/Cosmonaut/Taikonaut
 International Space Station
 List of people who have walked on the Moon
 Bandeirantes
 Chronology of European exploration of Asia
 Conquistador
 Exploration
 List of explorations
 List of lost expeditions
 List of female explorers and travelers
 List of maritime explorers
 List of Russian explorers
 List of travelers
 Maritime timeline
 Portuguese discoveries
 Radhanites
 Silk Road
 Spice trade
 The Exploration Museum
 Timeline of maritime migration and exploration
 Trans-Saharan trade
 Travel literature

References

External links 
 " The Historyscoper – explorers